USS Enterprise (NCC-1701-D), or Enterprise-D, is a starship in the Star Trek media franchise. Under the command of Captain Jean-Luc Picard, it is the main setting of Star Trek: The Next Generation (1987–1994) and the film Star Trek Generations (1994). It has also been depicted in various spinoffs, films, books, and licensed products.

The Next Generation occurs in the 24th century, 78 years after the adventures of Captain James T. Kirk and the starship Enterprise. Andrew Probert's Enterprise-D updates Matt Jefferies' iconic 1960s Enterprise design, depicting a ship supporting a larger crew on a longer mission "to boldly go where no one has gone before."

Development and production

Concept 
Paramount Television Group and Star Trek creator Gene Roddenberry announced the development of a new Star Trek series in October 1986. Because the Enterprise had been "just as important to [the original Star Trek] as Kirk, Spock, and McCoy," the new ship was critical.

Whereas Captain Kirk led a five-year mission, the new crew would be outfitted for a mission of at least 10 years. To sustain such a journey, the new vessel would be twice as long, eight times the volume, and include the crew's families. Roddenberry also wanted the ship to depict an improved quality of life for its crew: it would be brighter, less militaristic, and have sleeker and more refined interfaces than the original Enterprise. He wanted the Enterprise to convey a harmony between science and quality of life.

The Enterprises registry was originally NCC-1701-7. The 7 became a G to be consistent with the new USS Enterprise, with registry NCC-1701-A, at the conclusion of Star Trek IV: The Voyage Home (1986). A February 1987 revision to the Next Generation writers' manual specified the show's Enterprise as the NCC-1701-D, carrying a crew of 907 and their families; by March, the crew complement was 1,012 and specified the show occurring 78 years after the original Star Trek.

Design 

Artists Andrew Probert, Rick Sternbach, and Michael Okuda were among the earliest Next Generation hires, and they had worked on Star Trek films. Probert, a concept artist, focused first on the bridge because that would be a frequent filming location. Roddenberry envisioned the bridge as having a forward viewscreen four times larger than in Star Trek, and for there to be a conference table on the bridge itself. As production design continued, the table was shifted to a conference room adjacent to the bridge, and an open bridge design formed. Probert designed a transporter to be near the bridge, but Roddenberry preferred that it be further away so characters could have conversations on their way to the transporter room.

Knowing the bridge would need to match up with the exterior design, Probert pinned up a "what if?" painting he'd made shortly after finalizing the Enterprise redesign for 1979's Star Trek: The Motion Picture as a referent. Unbeknownst to Probert, story editor David Gerrold took the image to a producers meeting. The producers liked the design and directed Probert to make it the basis for the new vessel. The sleeker lines and rounded contours that informed the interior design also influenced the exterior. The ship's many windows are meant to allow the crew to be in touch with their environment.

The new Enterprise retains the hallmarks of Matt Jefferies' design for the original Enterprise: a saucer section, engineering section, and a pair of engine nacelles. Probert did this in part to assuage skeptical fans who were concerned about the original Enterprise being "replaced". The design instead shifted placement and proportion: for example, the saucer section was enlarged and the warp nacelles shifted lower. Slanting the nacelle support pylons forward conveyed a sense of intense forward movement. Fans got their first look at the Enterprise in the July 1987 issue of Starlog.

Probert's design did not originally include the ability for the saucer and engineering sections to separate, and producers rejected his initial concepts for incorporating it. Probert said his biggest design challenge was creating a ship that looked as good in two pieces as it did in one piece. He had meant to add landing gear to the saucer's underside as he had with the film franchise Enterprise, but he got "distracted" and never added them.

Sets 

In October 1986, producers began planning the show's sets, including efforts to reuse props and materials from the film franchise. The films' engineering, sickbay, corridor, crew quarters, and bridge were redressed for The Next Generation. To save money in the first season, the observation lounge's windows were covered with carpet to become sickbay; a new lounge set was created for the second season. A multipurpose set that served as the cargo bay, shuttlecraft bay, holodeck, and gymnasium was built from scratch. While the bridge "seems immense," the set had the same  width as the original series bridge and was  longer. A lounge set was created in unused soundstage space after the first season: producers realized their existing sets were workspaces, and they wanted an area to depict the crew at rest.

The production crew did everything possible "within reason" both to recreate first-season sets and to imagine futuristic upgrades for the series finale, "All Good Things..." (1994), which presents the ship in three different time periods. Some props and details, such as the first-season conference room starship models, had been saved and were reused for the flashback scenes. Sets for the future scenes reused props from other episodes that posit the Enterprises appearance further in the future.

Filming models and visual effects 
Producers were aware that audiences had grown accustomed to the cinematic quality of models and effects in the franchise's films. They considered using only CGI models and effects, but anxiety about whether the vendor could consistently deliver high-quality work led to that idea's rejection. The producers turned to Industrial Light & Magic (ILM), who had worked on the Star Trek films, for the "Encounter at Farpoint" pilot. 

In March 1987, an ILM team led by Greg Jein and Ease Owyeung began building filming miniatures based on Probert's designs. They created two models for $75,000: a  model and a  model that separated into the saucer and engineering sections. The models were made of fiberglass and cast resin over aluminum frames, and neon lights and incandescents provided the models' interior lighting. ILM created several stock footage shots and effects, including the Enterprises jump to warp. The warp jump was featured in the show's opening sequence, but most of the other shots were too static and "didn't pan out." New Enterprise shots were created as necessary for each episode, and effects supervisor Robert Legato had over 350 such shots in his library by the seventh season. Legato disliked filming the six-foot model: its size made it hard to shoot for long shots, and its lack of surface details—some of which were drawn with pencil—made it difficult to use in close-ups. Jein supervised construction of a  miniature for the third season that was more detailed than the first two.

Transition to film 

Production designer Herman Zimmerman had more freedom for Star Trek Generations than he had on previous Star Trek films. Producers wanted to ensure Generations stayed true to the television series while also taking advantage of the film production's scope and budget. Interiors were relit and received several cosmetic changes, such as redesigned consoles, metallic accents, and replacing backlit displays with monitors. Some changes, like enhanced detailing and a redesigned bridge ceiling, were necessitated by the film cameras' higher resolution. The increased budget allowed for the creation of sophisticated new sets, such as the stellar cartography lab.

John Knoll led ILM's visual effects for the film, including an all-CGI warp jump effect for the Enterprise. ILM rewired and updated its six-foot Enterprise model for the saucer separation sequence. ILM made a  saucer section model to "crash" into an  planet surface model. An  model of the saucer's forward edge was used for close-ups of the crashed ship.

Depiction

Starfleet commissions the Galaxy-class USS Enterprise in 2363 under the command of Captain Jean-Luc Picard. The flagship of the United Federation of Planets, it is on a mission "to boldly go where no one has gone before." The crew explores the galaxy and makes first contact with several new species, including the Q Continuum and the Borg. A pair of two-part episodes depict a shift in command—to William Riker in "The Best of Both Worlds" and Edward Jellico in "Chain of Command"—but leadership reverts to Picard at the end of both arcs. The Enterprise also briefly appears in other franchise spinoffs: the pilots of Star Trek: Deep Space Nine (1993) and Star Trek: Picard (2020) and the finale of Star Trek: Enterprise (2005).

In 2371, as depicted in Star Trek Generations, the Duras sisters attack and heavily damage the Enterprise. A warp drive coolant leak causes an explosion that destroys the stardrive section. The saucer section crash lands on the surface of Veridian III and is damaged beyond repair.

The Enterprise is itself a protagonist in The Next Generation. Each episode's opening voiceover, which states that "these are the voyages of the starship Enterprise," frames the narrative as belonging to the ship rather than the crew. Jonathan Frakes, who played first officer William Riker, said, "When we negotiate our contracts, Paramount's company line is that the ship is in fact the star of the show!"

Critical reaction 
io9 ranked the Enterprise-D as the fifth best version of the franchise's Enterprises, with Popular Mechanics calling it the third best and SyFy ranking it the second best. Space.com said the Enterprise brief appearance is the highlight of the opening scene of Star Trek: Picard first episode (2020).

Cultural impact 
In October 2006, the six-foot Enterprise miniature was auctioned at Christie's, along with other models, props, costumes, and set pieces from the Star Trek franchise. Its projected value was $25,000 to $35,000, but the final sale price was $576,000—the most expensive item in the auction.

References

Citations

Sources

External links

Enterprise-D
Star Trek: The Next Generation
Fictional elements introduced in 1987